Kakkad is a suburb of Kannur Town in Kannur district of Kerala state, south India. It is 4 km from Kannur town.
Cannanore Spinning and Weaving Mill is situated in Kakkad. The Kakkad River also flows through the region and is an integral part of the settlement.

Schools
Govt. Mappila UP School (One of the oldest schools in Kannur)
Puzhathi North UP School
Puzhathi High School
Koranjan Aided UP School
Bharathiya Vidya Bhavan
Amritha Vidyalayam
Kaoser English School
VP MAHMOUD HAJI MEMORIAL English Medium School
Kakkad Academy English Medium School
Darul Furqan Islamic Academi
 Majlis Hifdul Quran College

Major Organizations

Kakkad Juma Masjid
Hydross Juma Masjid
Chirakkara palli.
Darunnajath Yatheem Khana
Thahdeebul Uloom Madrassa
Sree Muthappan Temple
Shadullipali Juma Masjid
Thaqwa Masjid Shadulippalli
Sirajul Uloom Sunni Madrasa Shadulippalli
Guru Mandiram
Darul Furqan Islamic Academi
Thajul Ulama Square Kakkad

References 

Suburbs of Kannur